Gorytocephalus is a genus of worms belonging to the family Neoechinorhynchidae.

The species of this genus are found in Southern America.

Species:

Gorytocephalus elongorchis 
Gorytocephalus plecostomorum 
Gorytocephalus spectabilis 
Gorytocephalus talaensis

References

Neoechinorhynchidae
Acanthocephala genera